A cockatrice is a mythical beast, essentially a two-legged dragon, wyvern, or serpent-like creature with a rooster's head. Described by Laurence Breiner as "an ornament in the drama and poetry of the Elizabethans", it was featured prominently in English thought and myth for centuries.

Legend

Origins
The cockatrice was first mentioned in the Bible in Isaiah chapters 11, 14 and 59; however, the majority of commentaries believe what the KJV calls cockatrices are actually an adder or a serpent known as a basilisk. Essentially, biblical versions vary in how they translate the Hebrew word tsepha. It is described in its current form in the late fourteenth century. 

The Oxford English Dictionary gives a derivation from Old French cocatris, from medieval Latin calcatrix, a translation of the Greek ichneumon, meaning tracker. The twelfth century legend was based on a reference in Pliny's Natural History that the ichneumon lay in wait for the crocodile to open its jaws for the trochilus bird to enter and pick its teeth clean. An extended description of the cocatriz by the 15th-century Spanish traveller in Egypt, Pedro Tafur, makes it clear that this refers to the Nile crocodile.

According to Alexander Neckam's De naturis rerum (ca 1180), the basilisk (basiliscus) was the product of an egg laid by a rooster and incubated by a toad; a snake might be substituted in re-tellings. Cockatrice became seen as synonymous with basilisk when the basiliscus in Bartholomeus Anglicus' De proprietatibus rerum (ca 1260) was translated by John Trevisa as cockatrice (1397).  This legend has a possible Egyptian folk root; the eggs of the ibis were regularly destroyed for fear that the venom of the snakes they consumed would cause a hybrid snake-bird to hatch.

It is thought that a cock egg would hatch out as a cockatrice, and this could be prevented by tossing the egg over the family house, landing on the other side of the house, without allowing the egg to hit the house.

Abilities

The cockatrice has the reputed ability to kill people by either looking at them—"the death-darting eye of Cockatrice"—touching them, or sometimes breathing on them.

It was repeated in the late-medieval bestiaries that the weasel is the only animal that is immune to the glance of a cockatrice. It was also thought that a cockatrice would die instantly upon hearing a rooster crow, and according to legend, having a cockatrice look at itself in a mirror is one of the few sure-fire ways to kill it.

Cultural references
The first use of the word in English was in John Wyclif's 1382 translation of the Bible to translate different Hebrew words. This usage was followed by the King James Version, the word being used several times. The Revised Version—following the tradition established by Jerome's Vulgate basiliscus—renders the word as "basilisk", and the New International Version translates it as "viper". In Proverbs 23:32 the similar Hebrew tzeph'a is rendered "adder", both in the Authorized Version and the Revised Version.

In Shakespeare's play Richard III (c. 1593), the Duchess of York compares her son Richard to a cockatrice:

A cockatrice is also mentioned in Romeo and Juliet (1597), in Act 3, scene 2 line 47, by Juliet.

Nathan Field, in the first scene of  his play The Honest Man's Fortune (1647), also uses the idea that a cockatrice could kill with its eyes:... never threaten with your eyes, they are no cockatrice's...

In E. R. Eddison's high fantasy novel The Worm Ouroboros (1922), Chapter 4 has King Gorice show a cockatrice to Gro:

A cockatrice is mentioned in Harry Potter and the Goblet of Fire (2000) by Hermione Granger in chapter fifteen. A cockatrice involved in one of the tasks of the 1792 Triwizard Tournament escaped and injured the headmasters of the three participating schools, an incident cited as the cause for the cancellation of Triwizard Tournaments until 1994. Some translations instead state the cockatrice to be a basilisk or an "occamy", an in-universe relative of the snallygaster. Additionally, heraldry of a white cockatrice holding a broomstick on a blue and beige background is shown to be the emblem of the French National Quidditch team in the 2003 video game Harry Potter: Quidditch World Cup.

In the video game Boktai: The Sun Is in Your Hand (2003), cockatrices are among the enemies the player face in Sol City.

In the animated series My Little Pony: Friendship is Magic (2010-2019), a cockatrice is stated to live in the Everfree Forest. In the 2011 episode "Stare Master", the cockatrice turns Twilight Sparkle and one of Fluttershy's chickens, Elizabeak, to stone using its gaze, but reverts them back after being intimidated by Fluttershy's own stare.

On the SCP Foundation collaborative writing project, cockatrices are shown in the story SCP-1013 - Cockatrice (2011). An SCP-1013 instead paralyzes its prey by staring at them, only turning their skin to stone upon biting them, after which it will peck through the calcified skin to eat their prey's fleshy innards. SCP-1013 reproduce from growths budding off of the tail of a well-fed adult. The story SCP-1013 - Cockatrice won fourth place in the site's SCP-1000 Contest, a contest that prefaced the opening of the site's second series.

A cockatrice is shown as the main antagonist in the first episode of Netflix's anime adaptation of Little Witch Academia (2017), "Starting Over". The cockatrice is also a dungeon boss in the underground labyrinth gameplay section of Little Witch Academia: Chamber of Time (2017), a video game for PC and PS4.

In heraldry 

Arthur Fox-Davies describes the cockatrice as "comparatively rare" in heraldry, and as closely resembling a wyvern outside of possessing a rooster's head rather than a dragon's. The cockatrice, like the rooster, is often depicted with its comb, wattles and beak being of a different color from the rest of its body. The cockatrice is sometimes referred to as a basilisk, but Fox-Davies distinguishes the two on the basis of the heraldic basilisk possessing a tail ending in a dragon's head, although he does not know of any arms depicting such a creature.

In continental European heraldic systems, cockatrices may be simply referred to as dragons instead.

The cockatrice was the heraldic beast of the Langleys of Agecroft Hall in Lancashire, England as far back as the 14th century.

It is also the symbol of 3 (Fighter) Squadron, a fighter squadron of the Royal Air Force.

It is also represented on the coat of arms of Bornholm, a danish island in the baltic sea, and is related to the liberation of the island in 1658.

Notes

See also
 Abraxas
 Anzu (dinosaur)
 Basan
 Basilisco Chilote
 Basilisk
 Cockatrice (Dungeons & Dragons)
 Colo Colo (mythology)
 Ichneumon (medieval zoology)
 Kye-ryong (Korean Cockatrice)
 Snallygaster
 Wherwell
 Yi (dinosaur)
 The Book of the Dun Cow (novel)

References

Further reading 
 Laurence A. Breiner, "The Career of the Cockatrice", Isis 70:1 (March  1979), pp. 30–47
 P. Ansell Robin, "The Cockatrice and the 'New English Dictionary'", in Animal Lore in English Literature (London 1932).
 The Medieval Bestiary: "Basilisk" (includes Cockatrice)

External links
Dave's Mythical Creatures and Places: Cockatrice

Mythological galliforms
Legendary serpents
Medieval European legendary creatures
Mythological hybrids
European dragons
Mythological monsters
Legendary birds